The Sheilas was a British novelty pop girl group, famous for a 2007 jingle promoting car insurance company Sheilas' Wheels in an advertising campaign in the United Kingdom.

History
The Sheilas were Emma Robbins, Carly Romain and Cathi Ogden. The three singers were brought together to sing a jingle for the female-orientated insurance company Sheilas' Wheels, which in turn takes its name from Sheila, the Australian slang word for women. The Sheilas were featured singing the in advertisements aired during ITV Weather, its lyrics including many references to the weather. The attention they received led to requests for them to sing at universities in the UK, so they created a set and did some performances. 

They released their only single, "(I'm So) Happy Happy (You're Mine)", by download on 17 September 2007. The singlean extended version of the Sheilas' Wheels jinglewas written and produced by Mike Stock and Pete Waterman of Stock Aitken Waterman Productions. It was unsuccessful, peaking at #91 in the UK charts.

The trio has also recorded at least three other mixes of the song with SAW, released on a promotional CD on 24 September 2007.

Discography
Single
"(I'm So) Happy Happy (You're Mine)"

Promo CD (2007)
 "(I'm So) Happy Happy (You're Mine) - Radio Edit"
 "Extended Mix"
 "Riff & Rays Extended Mix"
 "Riff & Rays Radio Edit"

References

External links
The Sheilas on Myspace
 

Musical groups established in 2007
British pop girl groups
British musical trios